Deferribacter is a genus in the phylum Deferribacterota (Bacteria).

Etymology
The name Deferribacter derives from:Latin pref. de-, from; Latin noun ferrum, iron; New Latin masculine gender noun, a rodbacter, nominally meaning "a rod", but in effect meaning a bacterium, rod; New Latin masculine gender noun Deferribacter, rod that reduces iron.

Species
The genus contains 4 species, namely
 D. abyssi Miroshnichenko et al. 2003; (Latin genitive case noun abyssi, of immense depths, living in the depths of the ocean.)
 D. autotrophicus Slobodkina et al. 2009; (New Latin masculine gender adjective autotrophicus, autotrophic.)
 D. desulfuricans Takai et al. 2003; (New Latin participle adjective desulfuricans, reducing sulfur.)
 D. thermophilus Greene et al. 1997 ((Type species of the genus).; Greek noun thermē (θέρμη), heat; New Latin masculine gender adjective philus (from Greek masculine gender adjective φίλος), friend, loving; New Latin masculine gender adjective thermophilus, heat loving.)

Phylogeny
The currently accepted taxonomy is based on the List of Prokaryotic names with Standing in Nomenclature (LPSN) and National Center for Biotechnology Information (NCBI)

See also
 Bacterial taxonomy
 Microbiology
 List of bacterial orders
 List of bacteria genera

References

Bacteria genera
Deferribacterota